is a Japanese football player currently playing for Sagan Tosu.

Club statistics
Updated to 19 December 2020.

National team statistics

References

External links
Profile at Vissel Kobe
 
 

1987 births
Living people
Fukuoka University alumni
Association football people from Fukuoka Prefecture
Japanese footballers
Japan international footballers
J1 League players
J2 League players
Sagan Tosu players
Vissel Kobe players
Cerezo Osaka players
Association football midfielders